Allen & Overy LLP (informally A&O) is an international law firm.  The firm has 580 partners and over 5,600 people worldwide.  In 2022 A&O reported an increase in revenue to GBP1.96 billion and is the second largest law firm headquartered in the UK by revenue.

History

Allen & Overy was founded in the City of London on 1 January 1930 by George Allen and Thomas Overy, formerly partners at Roney & Co. The main purpose was to build a commercial practice. The firm's reputation was made as a result of George Allen's role as adviser to King Edward VIII during the abdication crisis of 1936. By the time World War II broke out in 1939, Allen & Overy had firmly established itself as a leading City law firm.

Over the years, Allen & Overy has been involved in many developments in the legal field. Such work has included advising on the first hostile takeover in the City of London and acting for S. G. Warburg & Co. The firm arranged the first Eurobond (issued by Italian motorway group Autostrada) in the 1960s. The Eurobond transaction significantly diversified Allen & Overy's practice from a purely commercial into commercial and financial firm. Through the 1970s the firm's finance and corporate practice grew in the UK and internationally.

In 1996, non-UK clients contributed more to Allen & Overy's revenue than UK clients. In 1998, non-UK clients contributed two-thirds of revenue.

In 1999, Allen & Overy hired a team of banking and finance lawyers in Paris from its then ally, Gide Loyrette Nouel.

In 2000, Allen & Overy merged with part of the Amsterdam, Brussels and Luxembourg offices of Loeff Claeys Verbeke.

In May 2004, the worldwide partnership of Allen & Overy converted to a limited liability partnership, Allen & Overy LLP, which works together with associated undertakings in some jurisdictions to form a worldwide legal practice. In July 2008 Allen & Overy broke the £1 billion turnover mark, and, for the first time, over half of its turnover was generated outside London.

In 2009, following the Global Financial Crisis, Allen & Overy completed a redundancy programme which saw 400 partners and staff lose their jobs globally. As well as cutting 47 partners, the firm cut around 200 fee-earners and 200 members of support staff, half of which were based in London. Allen & Overy de-equitised a further 35 partners. In the same year, Allen & Overy demerged its private client department, which became Maurice Turnor Gardner LLP.

In 2014, Allen & Overy became the first Magic Circle firm to establish an office in sub-Saharan Africa when it opened an office in Johannesburg, South Africa.

A 2021 assessment singled out Allen & Overy among law firms as engaging in the most transactional work for fossil fuel companies.

Projects
aosphere. aosphere is an online subscription business.
Fuse. Fuse is a technology innovation space where technology companies, Allen & Overy lawyers, technologists and their clients can collaborate to “explore, develop and test legal, regulatory and deal-related solutions”. Fuse was launched in September 2017. Technology startups that have formed part of Fuse include data extraction and machine-learning software providers, Kira Systems and Neota Logic, as well as Bloomsbury AI, a natural language processing software provider. Bloomsbury AI was acquired by Facebook in 2018. Facebook uses its software to address content issues, including fake news. In September 2017, content aggregator Vable was selected as one of the first seven companies to benefit from the innovation space. 
Legal services centre. In 2011, Allen & Overy opened a legal services centre in Belfast, one of the first law firms to do so. In 2022 Allen & Overy opened an additional legal services centre in Johannesburg.
 Peerpoint. Peerpoint is a contract lawyer service platform.

Offices
Allen & Overy has 44 offices in 31 countries across Africa, Asia Pacific, Europe, North America, Latin America and the Middle East.

Diversity and inclusion
In 2018, the firm has faced criticism over diversity and gender pay gap

Gender. In 2010, Allen & Overy announced that it was offering full equity partners the option to work part-time. The move was hailed as a 'watershed moment' for the legal sector. It is believed to be the first scheme of its kind by any major international law firm.
LGBT+. Allen & Overy's LGBT+ network, A&Out, which was launched in 2016, supports its members by hosting a variety of events that aim to raise awareness of LGBT issues, and to allow members to network. Allen & Overy was ranked in the top 100 of the Stonewall Workplace Equality Index 2018, an audit of workplace culture for LGBT+ staff in the UK. In 2017, Allen and Overy advised Stonewall on the Alan Turing law on a pro bono basis. The Alan Turing law is an informal term for the law in the United Kingdom, contained in the Policing and Crime Act 2017, which serves as an amnesty law to pardon men who were cautioned or convicted under historical legislation that outlawed homosexual acts.

Leadership

The table below sets out a history of Allen & Overy's leadership:

Notable alumni

Some of the firm's notable alumni include:

Academia
 Marike Paulsson – Director of the University of Miami's School of Law International Arbitration Institute.
 John Dewar – UK law professor and the Vice-Chancellor of La Trobe University.

Arts
 Nick Laird – Northern Irish novelist and poet.

Business
Steuart Walton – American heir, attorney, pilot, businessman and philanthropist.

Politics and government
Ferdinand Grapperhaus – Dutch politician and Minister of Justice and Security.
Annagrazia Calabria – Italian politician.
Patricia Ceysens – Belgian politician.
David Wootton – British lawyer and politician. He was the 684th Lord Mayor of London, from 2011 to 2012, and Alderman of the Ward of Langbourn.
 Sir Christopher Walford – a British lawyer and politician. He was the 667th Lord Mayor of London, and the seventh solicitor since records began in 1730 to become Lord Mayor. He also became the fifth person in A&O's history to receive a knighthood.
Heath Tarbert – Assistant Secretary of the Treasury for International Markets and Investment Policy.

References

External links

Allen & Overy
Law firms established in 1930
Chepiga, Pamela
1930 establishments in England